Ethmia iridella is a moth in the family Depressariidae. It is found in Mexico.

The ground color of the forewings is white. The ground color of the hindwings is white, but faintly grayish along the costa and tinged with pale ocherous at the apex.

References

Moths described in 1973
iridella